Abit is a village in Mon State, Burma.

References

 

Populated places in Mon State